HMAS Kiama, named for the coastal town of Kiama, New South Wales, was one of 60 s constructed during World War II, and one of 36 initially manned and commissioned solely by the Royal Australian Navy (RAN).

After World War II, the corvette was one of four sold to the Royal New Zealand Navy (RNZN). She served as HMNZS Kiama from 1952 until 1976, when the corvette was paid off and marked for disposal.

Design and construction

In 1938, the Australian Commonwealth Naval Board (ACNB) identified the need for a general purpose 'local defence vessel' capable of both anti-submarine and mine-warfare duties, while easy to construct and operate. Construction of the prototype  did not go ahead, but the plans were retained. The need for locally built 'all-rounder' vessels at the start of World War II saw the "Australian Minesweepers" (designated as such to hide their anti-submarine capability, but popularly referred to as "corvettes") approved in September 1939, with 60 constructed during the course of the war: 36 (including Kiama) ordered by the RAN, 20 ordered by the British Admiralty but manned and commissioned as RAN vessels, and 4 for the Royal Indian Navy.

Kiama was constructed by Evans Deakin & Co, at Brisbane, Queensland. She was laid down on 2 November 1942, and launched on 3 July 1943 by Mrs. G. Lawson, wife of the Minister for Transport. Kiama was commissioned into the RAN on 26 January 1944. The coastal community of Kiama, after which the vessel was named, donated recreational materiel for her crew including a radio set, books, and a 16 mm movie projector.

Operational history

World War II
Kiamas first deployment was in March 1944 to Milne Bay in New Guinea. From her arrival until September 1944, the corvette's main duty was to escort convoys along the New Guinea coastline, although a reassignment for the duration of June saw Kiama perform anti-submarine patrols in the Solomon Sea. In September, Kiama was used to transport soldiers between New Guinea and New Britain. On conclusion, she resumed her convoy escort role until the end of 1944, when she departed for Sydney.

Commandos from 
In September 1944 'C' Troop and a small detachment from 'B' Troop, from the 2/8th Commando Squadron were landed from HMAS Kiama on a reconnaissance operation at Jacquinot Bay on the island of New Britain, to collect intelligence in preparation for an assault by the 5th Division.

The corvette arrived in Sydney on 21 December 1944. On 25 December, the crew was recalled from leave to go to the assistance of the liberty ship , which had been torpedoed by German submarine . Kiama was assigned to anti-submarine patrols near Sydney for the final days of the year, before sailing to Adelaide for a month-long refit on 3 January 1945.

Post-refit, Kiama was assigned to Fremantle for two months of anti-submarine warfare exercises with the United States Navy, before returning to New Guinea on 7 May 1945. In May and June, the corvette performed several coastal bombardments in the Bougainville area. In July, Kiama transported Prince Henry, Duke of Gloucester from New Guinea to the Solomon Islands, then spent the rest of the month moving troops and military cargo between these two locations. From 5 to 24 August, the corvette was based in Brisbane, before returning to New Guinea waters. Kiama spent the rest of 1945 as a troop and supply transport, minesweeper, and general duties vessel. When the war ended, Kiama took part in the Japanese surrender at Rabaul. In November, Kiama was assigned to escort demilitarized Japanese cruiser  as the cruiser embarked Japanese soldiers in New Guinea for repatriation.

Kiama returned to Sydney on 29 January 1946. In February she paid a six-day farewell visit to the town of Kiama, ahead of her decommission into the Reserve on 3 April. She earned two battle honours: "Pacific 1944–45" and "New Guinea 1944".

Transfer to RNZN

On 5 March 1952, Kiama and three other Bathurst-class corvettes (and ) were transferred to the Royal New Zealand Navy. Kiama was commissioned into the RNZN, receiving the prefix HMNZS. Upon acquisition by New Zealand, the corvette was converted into a training ship. Kiamas 4-inch gun and aft minesweeping equipment were removed, and replaced with two 40 mm Bofors anti-aircraft guns.

In 1964, Kiama was re-commissioned in the 27th Fisheries Protection Squadron. Other duties included search-and-rescue operations and transportation of scientific teams to small island along New Zealand's coastline. The corvette revisited her namesake town in Australia in late 1966.

Fate
Kiama was paid off for disposal on 19 August 1976 and broken up in 1979.

Citations

References

Books

Journal and news articles

Bathurst-class corvettes of the Royal Australian Navy
World War II corvettes of Australia
1943 ships
Bathurst-class corvettes of the Royal New Zealand Navy